RTL 102.5 is a private Italian radio station.

It has been the first Italian radio station using the format Contemporary hit radio, which involves the broadcasting of greatest hits only.

The RTL 102.5 group includes also the advertising agency Openspace and the satellite television channel RTL 102.5 TV (formerly Hit Channel) where is broadcast the whole radio schedule.

History 
Lorenzo Suraci, the current president, took it over in 1988 to advertise his Capriccio discothèque in Arcene, near Bergamo. Rapidly RTL's signal was extended in the whole North of Italy. Then, Suraci tested the national isofrequency to make RTL receivable in the whole of Italy on the same frequency, 102.5 MHz. In 1990 it became one of the 14 Italian national networks. It has been the first private Italian radio station creating its own editorial structure, now directed by Luigi Tornari.

The headquarters are in Cologno Monzese, in the first building in Europe created especially for radio. RTL 102.5 also has an office in Rome, in via Virginio Orsini, near the Piazza del Popolo, which houses part of the editorial staff, recording rooms and the studio from which programs like Onorevole DJ and Chi c'è c'è, chi non c'è non parla are broadcast.

Presenters 
Presenters currently on RTL 102.5:

Alberto Bisi

Andrea De Sabato
Andrea Pamparana
Andrea Salvati
Angelo Baiguini
Angelo Di Benedetto
Armando Piccolillo
Barbara Sala
Bruno Vespa
Carletto
Carlo Elli
Charlie Gnocchi
Conte Galé
Cristina Borra
Davide Giacalone
Fabio Santini
Fabrizio Ferrari
Federico Vespa
Fernando Proce
Francesca Cheyenne
Fulvio Giuliani
Gabriele Parpiglia
Gigio D'Ambrosio
Giorgia Surina
Giorgio Ginex
Giusi Legrenzi
Harold Davies
Il Trio
Jennifer Pressman
La Zac
Laura Ghislandi
Luca Dondoni
Max Viggiani
Myriam Fecchi
Nicoletta Deponti
Nino Mazzarino
Paolo Cavallone
Pierluigi Diaco
Pio e Amedeo
Roberto Uggeri
Sara Ventura
Silvia Annichiarico

Former Radio Caroline presenter Grant Benson also worked for the station in the nineties.

From 2005 to November 2007 the station manager was Roberto Zaino. Before that, his predecessor was Luca Viscardi.

News Correspondent Network 

RTL 102.5's News Correspondent Network, set up in August 1991, was a first in the history of national private radio in Italy. To date, it has received numerous accolades and awards for the quality and standard of its reporting.

The team consists of 16 journalists and 120 correspondents located in all major Italian cities, with the five primary editorial offices in Milan, Rome, Naples, Turin and Palermo. Additionally, there are correspondents in other major European cities like London, Paris, Berlin, Athens, Dublin, Monte Carlo and Moscow. Internationally, there are bureaux in the United States (New York and Los Angeles) and Lima, Peru.

The Milan editorial staff consists of Fulvio Giuliani, Paolo Pacchioni, Ivana Faccioli, Sergio Gadda, Alessandra Giannoli, Jolanda Granato, Giusi Legrenzi, Jennifer Pressman, Giovanni Perria, Antonella Rocchi, Andrea Salvati and Max Viggiani. The Rome editorial staff consists of Alberto Ciapparoni, Gabriele Manzo, Maria Paola Raiola and Federico Vespa.

External links 
 

Mass media in Milan
Mass media in Rome
Mass media in Naples
Radio stations in Italy
Radio stations established in 1975